Typhina belcheri is a species of sea snail, a marine gastropod mollusk in the family Muricidae, the murex snails or rock snails.

Description
The length of the shell attains 18 mm.

Distribution
This species occurs in the Atlantic Ocean off Brazil, Mauritania and the Western Sahara.

References

 Houart, R, Buge, B. & Zuccon, D. (2021). A taxonomic update of the Typhinae (Gastropoda: Muricidae) with a review of New Caledonia species and the description of new species from New Caledonia, the South China Sea and Western Australia. Journal of Conchology. 44(2): 103–147.

External links
 Broderip, W. J. & Sowerby, G. B. I. (1832-1833). (Descriptions of new species of shells from the collection formed by Mr. Cuming on the western coast of South America, and among the islands of the southern Pacific Ocean). Proceedings of the Committee of Science and correspondence of the Zoological Society of London. Part II for 1832: 25–33
 Petit de la Saussaye S. (1840). Description de deux espèces de coquilles nouvelles, appartenant aux genres Rostellaria et Murex. Revue Zoologique, par la Société Cuviérienne. (1840): 326-327

Typhina
Gastropods described in 1833